"Que Levante La Mano" ("Raise Your Hand") is a song written by Argentine composer Alejandro Vezzani and performed by Mexican musical group Los Ángeles de Charly for their third studio album Te Voy a Enamorar (2001) where it was released as the second single in 2002. The song is clearly an anthem for all the persons that have suffered in the love, with verses like
 It peaked at #46 on the Hot Latin Songs and #16 on the Regional Mexican Airplay charts in the United States. In 2002, Puerto Rican merengue singer Joseph Fonseca covered "Que Levante La Mano" for his second studio album Escuchame. A bachata version was also recorded for the album. Fonseca's cover was released as a single in 2003 and peaked at #40 on the Hot Latin Songs and #5 on the Latin Tropical Airplay charts in the US.

Américo version

In 2008, Chilean musician Américo covered "Que Levante La Mano" for his second studio album A Morir. It was as the second single on 21 July 2009 in radios in Chile. The music video of the song was released previously than the single release, specifically the 9 July 2009. The video is a concert recording.

Promotion 

The single has become a Cumbia standard since its release, being used in many Chilean TV shows. Américo has performed the song in TV shows promoting his album A Morir, and since its release it is recognized as Américo's signature song. Some of these TV shows are Buenos dias a todos, Mira quien habla, Viva la mañana, Intrusos, S.Q.P., Alfombra roja, Calle 7, Yingo, Mucho gusto, Pollo en Conserva, Animal nocturno, Chile, país de talentos and La muralla infernal. Also he performed the song in reality shows such as Pelotón y 1810.

In other media 
The song was featured in the 2015 film The 33.

References

2001 songs
2002 singles
2003 singles
2008 singles
Américo songs
Fonovisa Records singles
Spanish-language songs